Eleftheria Evgenia Efstathiou (born July 5, 1989) is a Greek swimmer.  She competed in the 400 and 800 metre freestyle and 200 metre butterfly at the 2008 Summer Olympics

References

1989 births
Living people
Greek female swimmers
Greek female freestyle swimmers
Olympic swimmers of Greece
Panathinaikos swimmers
Swimmers at the 2008 Summer Olympics
Greek female butterfly swimmers
Swimmers from Athens